How to Lose a Country: The Seven Steps from Democracy to Dictatorship is a 2019 nonfiction book by Ece Temelkuran, discussing how democracies backslide into dictatorships. It was written in English and published in the United Kingdom by 4th Estate.

She outlines the steps on how democracies gradually unravel and discusses this in the context of the rise of Recep Tayyip Erdoğan. Temelkuran's argument is that the same decay of democracy that happened in Turkey can happen in countries in the West.

Hannah Lucinda Smith of The Times wrote that the book is "highly readable and vibrates with outrage" although she criticises the book for mainly focusing on right-wing populism and not adequately describing left wing populism.

Satish Deshpande of The Hindu argued that there are parallels to the rule of Narendra Modi, using the word "saptapadi" to refer to the processes Temelkuran outlined. The book does not discuss Modi.

References

External links
 How to Lose a Country - 4th Estate
 How to Lose a Country - HarperCollins Australia
 How to Lose a Country - HarperCollins United States

2019 non-fiction books
Recep Tayyip Erdoğan
Fourth Estate books